Dean Zayas Pereira (October 17, 1938 – February 3, 2022) was a Puerto Rican actor, director, playwright, author, poet, dramatic arts professor, and television show host. He directed some of Puerto Rico's best known telenovelas, such as Cristina Bazán, Coralito and Tanairi among others. Zayas was a catedràtic at the University of Puerto Rico, Rio Piedras Campus, for over 50 years.

Biography
Zayas Pereira was born in Barrio Canas in Caguas, Puerto Rico. His father was a farmer who would spend a lot of hours reading farming books, and Zayas Pereira became himself an avid reader. Zayas Pereira had a vivid imagination with which he developed imaginary friends; he would talk by himself while thinking he was talking to someone else. His constant reading and the conversations he had with himself evolved into him creating elaborate stories about him and his imaginary friends, and he developed those stories into plays that he would perform for his family. By the time he was in 5th grade, his dad decided to take him to a local radio station where he was able to speak at a farming themed radio show.

Zayas Pereira's sister helped him secure a spot in a play named La Zapatera Prodigiosa, which had been written by Federico Garcia Lorca, before he turned 11 years old. Soon, their mother died and he and his sisters moved to New York City. In the United States, Zayas Pereira studied junior and high school before enrolling at Princeton University, (from which he did not graduate), and, later on, at New York University. Between studying at those two universities, Zayas Pereira worked at a company's publicity department.

After a visit to his father in Puerto Rico in the 1960s, Zayas Pereira remained in his home country to enroll at the University of Puerto Rico's theater class. He graduated in 1963. Having also graduated from NYU with a master's degree in theater, Zayas Pereira became a drama teacher at UPR in 1969 and was also named director of the university's drama department (the latter title which he held until 2014). Zayas Pereira decided that he preferred teaching and directing to acting.

Eventually, Zayas Pereira was hired as a director by el canal 2, a Telemundo channel in Puerto Rico, where his directorial debut came with the 1980 telenovela "El Idolo", which starred Venezuelan Jose Luis Rodriguez and Cuban-Puerto Rican Marilyn Pupo. He then directed 1982's "Fue Sin Querer" and 1983's "Coralito", where he directed, among others, actors such as female lead Sully Diaz, Braulio Castillo, hijo, Claribel Medina (the latter three, all Puerto Ricans) and Mexican Salvador Pineda, the male lead. In 1985, he directed "Tanairi" with Mexican Juan Ferrara as the male lead and Puerto Rican Von Marie Mendez as the female lead. In 1989, he directed "Karina Montaner" and in 1990, he directed "Aventurera", which was his last work as a television director, since he decided to concentrate on theater productions and on his job as an acting teacher instead.

On October 5, 2016, Zayas Pereira received an honorary degree from the UPR. He retired as a professor from that institution in 2019.

Show host
During 2001, Zayas Pereira was hired by WIPR channel 6, the Puerto Rican government's educational television channel, to host a show that was named "Estudio Actoral", a Puerto Rican version of the United States' "Inside the Actors Studio". Zayas Pereira interviewed such stars as Lin-Manuel Miranda and Edward James Olmos (whom he recalled as his most memorable interview and as an "intelligent, human and sincere man").

Health problems and death
In his older age, Zayas Pereira battled back problems. He died in an assisted living facility in Bayamón, on February 3, 2022, at the age of 83.

Biographical book
Zayas Pereira wrote a book about his life that was published during  2014, titled "Ese no es nadie" ("That One is no One"), the title of which he based on an incident he found comical when one day at Telemundo Puerto Rico, after he pulled up his car at the channel's parking lot, a celebrity spotter commented, upon seeing him inside the car, that "ese no es nadie", meaning she thought Zayas Pereira was an unimportant person.

See also

List of Puerto Ricans
Myrna Casas - another Puerto Rican playwright

References

External links
 

1938 births
2022 deaths
Puerto Rican actors
People from Caguas, Puerto Rico
Writers from New York City
Puerto Rican dramatists and playwrights
Puerto Rican television directors
Puerto Rican writers
Puerto Rican educators
University of Puerto Rico alumni
New York University alumni
Princeton University alumni
University of Puerto Rico faculty